

About
WULT is a Spanish music formatted broadcast radio station licensed to Sandston, Virginia and serving the Richmond, Virginia area. WULT is owned and operated by Mike Mazursky, through licensee Mobile Radio Partners, Inc.

The station currently focuses on playing a variety of popular Spanish musical artists and genres ranging from reggae to cumbia and everything in between. Together with the sister station, WULT and WBTL can be reached via phone at (804)741-8946. WULT primarily focuses on playing a variety of music for the local Spanish community to enjoy rather than focusing on one specific genre within the Spanish music community. This station offers a variety of voices as well as live giveaways and various programming opportunities to engage listeners.

History
On October 17, 2017, World Media Broadcast Company finalized the sale of the then-WCLM to Mobile Radio Partners, Inc., at a price of $75,000. The station changed their call letters to WUWN on the same day. On November 6, 2017, WUWN changed their format to rhythmic oldies, branded as "U Win Radio".

On March 14, 2018, WUWN changed format from rhythmic oldies to a hybrid of oldies and adult contemporary, branded as "Boomtown Radio". The playlist features music from the 60s to the 90s.

The station changed its call sign to WBTL on August 27, 2018, and then to WULT on September 11, 2018.  It switched to Spanish music as Ultra Richmond on the same day, breaking the simulcast with WBTL. WBTL continued to run the hybrid oldies format as Boomtown Richmond.

References

External links
Ultra 94.1 & 1540 Facebook

1959 establishments in Virginia
Radio stations established in 1959
ULT